Bagdadia gnomia is a moth in the family Gelechiidae. It was described by Ponomarenko in 1995. It is found in the Russian Far East.

References

Bagdadia
Moths described in 1995